Thomas V. Cronin (April 29, 1896 – April 24, 1964) was an American football halfback for the Green Bay Packers of the National Football League (NFL) in 1922. He played at the collegiate level at Marquette University and Loras College.

Biography
Cronin was born on April 29, 1896 in Janesville, Wisconsin. He died there on April 24, 1964.

See also
List of Green Bay Packers players

References

1896 births
1964 deaths
American football halfbacks
Green Bay Packers players
Marquette Golden Avalanche football players
Loras Duhawks football players
Sportspeople from Janesville, Wisconsin
Players of American football from Wisconsin